Richard Southgate (January 23, 1774 - July 1857) was an American attorney and politician. A native of New York, he held a number of public offices in Kentucky, including Commonwealth Attorney (1798-?), Representative (1803-?) and Senator (1817–1821).

See also
 Thomas S. Hinde, brother-in-law.
 Thomas Hinde, father-in-law.
 William Wright Southgate, son.

References

External links

Family of Richard & Ann Southgate

1774 births
1857 deaths
Kentucky lawyers
People from Newport, Kentucky
Members of the Kentucky House of Representatives
Kentucky state senators
College of William & Mary alumni